Alexandria Union Station is a historic railroad station in Alexandria, Virginia, south of Washington, D.C. To avoid confusion with nearby Washington Union Station, the station is often referred to as simply Alexandria. Its Amtrak code is ALX.

The station is located on Callahan Drive in the Old Town section of the city. It is served by both Amtrak intercity and Virginia Railway Express (VRE) commuter rail lines. The station serves as an alternative stop for Amtrak riders traveling through the Washington area, analogous to the role Newark Penn Station plays in the New York area.

It is located directly across the tracks from the King Street–Old Town station of the Washington Metro. Since the opening of the Metro station in 1983, the city has touted the station as an intermodal hub for regional mass transit, linking Amtrak, VRE, and Metro with a number of Alexandria DASH and Metrobus lines. The Virginia Department of Transportation and Northern Virginia Transportation Authority have plans to build a pedestrian tunnel between Union Station and King Street-Old Town; presently, those transferring from Amtrak to Metro must walk about  along King Street.

The original passenger terminal, a one-story brick building completed in 1905, is still in use. Unlike most stations from the era, it was built in the Federal Revival style. The station was extensively renovated in 1982, with further improvements in the mid-1990s. The stone and concrete Veterans of Foreign Wars memorial was constructed at the station in 1940.

History

In the late 1840s, the city of Alexandria invested in at least five major railroad projects to link the city with other commercial centers in what proved to be the forlorn hope of competing with Baltimore as a regional industrial and trade center. The numerous competing lines resulted in a mishmash of rails and yards running through the city amidst various railroad mergers and failures.

In 1901, the railroads serving the region, led by the Pennsylvania Railroad, Chesapeake and Ohio Railway, and Baltimore and Ohio Railroad, formed the Richmond-Washington Company to manage traffic between Richmond and Washington and build a consolidated railyard, Potomac Yard. The company's plans included construction of a new passenger terminal west of the city, in what was then part of Arlington County—Alexandria did not annex the land until 1915.

Alexandria Union Station was opened on September 15, 1905, and served passenger trains of the C&O, Washington Southern Railway, Southern Railway and Richmond, Fredericksburg & Potomac Railroad until 1971, when ownership of the station building was assumed by Amtrak, while C&O (now CSX Transportation bought the tracks. The City of Alexandria took ownership of the station in 2001.

Since the 1970s, Union Station has been the focus of Amtrak's regional services into Virginia. In 1976, Amtrak began running the Colonial from Washington through Alexandria to Newport News. It continues today as a Northeast Regional run.

On October 1, 2009, Amtrak began running two Northeast Regionals to and from Lynchburg, making stops in the state that include Union Station. This was followed by an additional extension to Richmond in 2009, Norfolk in 2012 and Roanoke in 2017.

Station layout

References

External links

Alexandria Union Station – VRE 
Alexandria Amtrak-VRE Station – USA Rail Guide (TrainWeb)

Union stations in the United States
Amtrak stations in Virginia
Alexandria Union Station
Railway stations in the United States opened in 1905
A
Alexandria
Transit centers in the United States
Bus stations in Virginia
Union Station
Railway stations on the National Register of Historic Places in Virginia
National Register of Historic Places in Alexandria, Virginia
1905 establishments in Virginia